Mehfuz (translation: Secure) is the fifth album from the Indian rock band Euphoria. Two of the songs on the album have been co-written by poet and lyricist Gulzar.

Songs 
 Soneya
 Mehfuz
 Bewafaa
 Bhoola Sab
 Roshni
 She's Beautiful
 Rab jaana 
 Savera
 Doha
 Kee Farek Painda
 Kyna's Song

External links
More @ Mehfuz on official euphoria website

2006 albums
Euphoria (Indian band) albums